was a short-lived leftist political party in early Shōwa period Japan.

Katō, its chairman, won a seat in the 1937 general election, but the party failed to create much popular support against the rising forces of militarism and against the rising inflation in the Japanese economy.

In December 1937, its members were arrested in the Popular Front Incident, and the party was disbanded.

References

Defunct political parties in Japan
Political parties established in 1937
Political parties disestablished in 1937
1937 establishments in Japan
1937 disestablishments in Japan